Phillip I. Good (born in 1937) is a Canadian-American mathematical statistician. He was educated at McGill University and the University of California at Berkeley. He has been married to Dorothy Marie LaGrandeur since 21 January 1997/

He was among the first to apply the bootstrap in his 1975 analyses of 2×2 designs with a missing cell.  His chief contributions to statistics are in the area of small sample statistics, including a uniformly most powerful unbiased (UMPU) permutation test for Type I censored data, an exact test for comparing variances, and an exact test for cross-over designs.

Selected publications

His published texts in statistics include the following:
 The A to Z of Error-Free Research,Chapman and Hall/CRC, 2012.
 A Practitioner's Guide to Resampling for Data Analysis, Data Mining, and Modeling,Chapman and Hall/CRC, 2011.
 Analyzing the Large Number of Variables in Biomedical and Satellite Imagery,Wiley, NY. 2011.
 Managers' Guide to the Design and Conduct of Clinical Trials, Wiley, NY, 2002 (2nd edition, 2006).
 Introduction to Statistics Using Resampling Methods and R/S-Plus. Wiley, 2005 (2nd edition, 2012).
 Introduction to Statistics Using Resampling Methods and Excel. Wiley, 2005.
 Common Errors in Statistics (and How to Avoid Them)(with J. Hardin), Wiley, 2003 (4th edition, 2012).
 Applying Statistics in the Courtroom: A New Approach for Attorneys and Expert Witnesses, Chapman Hall, London, 2001. 
 Resampling Methods, Birkhauser, Boston, 1999 (3rd edition, 2005).
 Permutation, Parametric and Bootstrap Tests of Hypotheses, Springer-Verlag, NY, 1994 (3rd edition, 2005).

He has published articles in
	Biology—Exp Geron 8(73)147; Mech Age Devel 4(75) 339.
	Biomathematics—J theoret Biol 34(72)99; Bull Math Biol 38(76)295.
	Biostatistics—Contemporary Clinical Trials 29(08)565.
	Computer Science—Computer Architecture News 16(88)3:40.
	Physics—Physics Essays 23(10)368.
	Probability—J Aust math soc 8(68)716.
	Statistics—J Nonpar Statist 1(92)253-262; J. Modern Appl. Statist. Meth. 1(02)243.

He has published nine texts on the application of microcomputers in business as well as several hundred articles on microcomputers in over a dozen different computer magazines. He has published 34 novels using six nommes des plumes for the zanybooks imprint. Those using his own name include "I Love You Maggie,""In Search of Aimai Cristen,""Sad and Angry Man,""Marriage and Children," "Confessions of a Gentleman Host," "San Onofre,","Susan," and "Schoolcraft MI."  He has published two collections of his short stories, "Pinkie: Stories of a Homeless Man," and "Relationships." 

1937 births
Living people
Canadian statisticians
McGill University alumni
University of California, Berkeley alumni